Naji Shushan (born January 14, 1981, in Tripoli, Libya) is a Libyan football defender currently playing for Alahly. He was a member of the Libya national football team.

External links

Player profile with Photo – Sporting-heroes.net
Player profile – MTN Africa Cup of Nations 2006

1981 births
Living people
Libyan footballers
Association football defenders
Libya international footballers
2006 Africa Cup of Nations players
People from Tripoli, Libya
Al-Ahli SC (Tripoli) players
Olympic Azzaweya SC players
Libyan Premier League players